Judith Lewis (née Rumelt; born July 27, 1973), better known by her pen name Cassandra Clare, is an American author of young adult fiction, best known for her bestselling series The Mortal Instruments.Personal life
Clare was born Judith Rumelt to American parents in Tehran, Iran. She is the daughter of Richard Rumelt, a business school professor and author. Her maternal grandfather was film producer Max Rosenberg. Clare is Jewish and has described her family as "not religious".

As a child, Clare traveled frequently, spending time in Switzerland, England, and France. She returned to Los Angeles for high school, and from then on split her time between California and New York City, where she worked at various entertainment magazines and tabloids, including The Hollywood Reporter.

While living in Los Angeles, Clare began writing fan fiction using the name Cassandra Claire. The Draco Trilogy, based on Harry Potter, and The Very Secret Diaries, based on The Lord of the Rings, were popular. However, she deleted her fan fiction from the Internet shortly before her first novel, City of Bones, was published under the name Cassandra Clare.

She is also friends with author Holly Black, and their books occasionally overlap, Clare mentioning characters from Black's novels and vice versa, such as Val and Luis from Black's Valiant.

Clare is also credited by her publisher with creating the "City of Fallen Angels treatment" where a tangible "letter" from one character to another is attached to the back of physical copies of a book. The goal is to spur print book sales.

In 2016, The Guardian reported that Clare was being sued by Sherrilyn Kenyon for 'willfully copying' her novels. Kenyon's suit was amended to drop the copyright claims and the remaining dispute over branding and cover designs was settled for an undisclosed amount.

, Clare resides in Amherst, Massachusetts, with her husband, Joshua Lewis, and three cats.

The Mortal Instruments series

In 2004, Clare started working on her first-published novel, City of Bones, inspired by the urban landscape of Manhattan. City of Bones was released by Simon & Schuster in 2007 and is a contemporary fantasy story revolving around characters Clary Fray, Jace Wayland, and Simon Lewis, which became a New York Times bestseller upon its release. City of Ashes and City of Glass completed the first trilogy. A subsequent second trilogy contained three more books: City of Fallen Angels, City of Lost Souls, and City of Heavenly Fire.

There is a prequel trilogy called The Infernal Devices, which is set in the same universe as The Mortal Instruments, but set in the Victorian era. This consisting of three books: Clockwork Angel, published on August 31, 2010, Clockwork Prince, published on December 6, 2011, and Clockwork Princess, published on March 19, 2013.

A fourth trilogy set in this universe was announced in 2012, to be collectively known as The Dark Artifices. The new contemporary series is set in Los Angeles, and follow female shadowhunter Emma Carstairs, who was introduced in City of Heavenly Fire. The first book, Lady Midnight, was released in March 2016; the second, Lord of Shadows was released in April 2017; the third, Queen of Air and Darkness was released on December 4, 2018.

There are also two series of interconnected short stories set in this universe. The first is The Bane Chronicles, completed in 2014 and written with Sarah Rees Brennan and Maureen Johnson, and the second is the planned Tales from the Shadowhunter Academy, written with Brennan and Johnson as well as Robin Wasserman.

The first book in The Mortal Instruments was made into a film, The Mortal Instruments: City of Bones (2013), by Unique Features and Constantin Film. First-time writer Jessica Postigo wrote the screenplay. Lily Collins played Clary Fray and Jamie Campbell Bower played Jace Wayland.

After a disappointing box office performance, subsequent movies in the series were cancelled. A television adaptation of The Mortal Instruments called Shadowhunters: The Mortal Instruments began airing in January 2016. It was canceled after the third season.

Awards
City of Bones
2010 Georgia Peach Book Awards for Teen Readers
Finalist for the Locus Award for Best First Novel of 2007
An American Library Association Teens Top Ten Award winner, 2008
2010 Georgia Peach Book Awards for Teen Readers
Winner of The 2010 Abraham Lincoln Illinois High School Book Award
Winner of the 2010 Pacific Northwest Library Association Young Reader's Choice Award
A Texas TAYSHAS title 2010
Shortlisted for the 2010 Evergreen Young Adult Book Award
Shortlisted for The 2010 Colorado Blue Spruce Young Adult Book Award
Shortlisted for The North Carolina School Library Media Association Young Adult Book Award
Oregon Young Adult Network Book Rave Reading List Title 2008
Shortlisted for the Coventry Inspiration Book Awards

City of Ashes
A 2009 ALA Teens Top Ten Title

City of Fallen Angels
Best Goodreads Author in 2011

City of Heavenly Fire
Goodreads Choice Awards Best Young Adult Fantasy & Science Fiction of 2014

Bibliography
 The Shadowhunter Chronicles 
 The Mortal Instruments 
 City of Bones (March 27, 2007) 
 City of Ashes (March 28, 2008) 
 City of Glass (March 24, 2009) 
 City of Fallen Angels (April 5, 2011) 
 City of Lost Souls (May 8, 2012) 
 City of Heavenly Fire (May 27, 2014) 

Mortal Instruments companion books

 Shadowshunters and Downworlders: A Mortal Instruments Reader (with Sarah Rees Brennan, Holly Black, Rachel Caine & Kami Garcia) (January 29, 2013) The Shadowhunter's Codex (with Joshua Lewis) (October 29, 2013) Tales From the Shadowhunter Academy (with Sarah Rees Brennan, Maureen Johnson & Robin Wasserman) (2015; print edition released November 15, 2016) A History of Notable Shadowhunters and Denizens of Downworld (illustrated by Cassandra Jean) (February 18, 2016) Ghosts of the Shadow Market: An Anthology of Tales (with Sarah Rees Brennan, Maureen Johnson, Robin Wasserman & Kelly Link) (June 4, 2019) 

 Mortal Instruments graphic novels 
Art by Cassandra Jean.

 The Mortal Instruments: The Graphic Novel, Vol. 1 (November 7, 2017) 
 The Mortal Instruments: The Graphic Novel, Vol. 2 (October 30, 2018) 
 The Mortal Instruments: The Graphic Novel, Vol. 3 (October 29, 2019) 
 The Mortal Instruments: The Graphic Novel, Vol. 4 (October 24, 2020) 
 The Mortal Instruments: The Graphic Novel, Vol. 5 (TBA March 29, 2022)

 Mortal Instruments coloring books 

 The Official Mortal Instruments Coloring Book (illustrated by Cassandra Jean) (April 25, 2017) 

The Infernal DevicesClockwork Angel (August 31, 2010) Clockwork Prince (December 6, 2011) Clockwork Princess (March 19, 2013) 

 Infernal Devices graphic novels 
Art by HyeKyung Baek.

 The Infernal Devices: Clockwork Angel, Volume 1 (October 10, 2012) 
 The Infernal Devices: Clockwork Prince, Volume 2 (September 30, 2013) 
 The Infernal Devices: Clockwork Princess, Volume 3 (July 22, 2014) 

 The Bane Chronicles 

 The Bane Chronicles (with Sarah Rees Brennan & Maureen Johnson) (2013–2014; print edition released November 11, 2014) 

The Dark Artifices
 Lady Midnight (March 8, 2016) 
 Lord of Shadows (May 23, 2017) 
 Queen of Air and Darkness (December 4, 2018) 

 The Eldest Curses 
This series is co-written with Wesley Chu.

 The Red Scrolls of Magic (March 9, 2019) 
 The Lost Book of White (September 1, 2020) 
 The Black Volume of the Dead (TBA)

The Last HoursChain of Gold (March 3, 2020) Chain of Iron (March 2, 2021) Chain of Thorns (January 31, 2023)

 The Wicked Powers 

 Untitled Book 1 (TBA) Untitled Book 2 (TBA) Untitled Book 3 (TBA)The Magisterium series
This series is written with Holly Black.
 The Iron Trial (September 9, 2014) 
 The Copper Gauntlet (September 1, 2015) 
 The Bronze Key (August 30, 2016) 
 The Silver Mask (October 10, 2017) 
 The Golden Tower (September 11, 2018) 

 The Sword Catcher series 

 Sword Catcher (October 10, 2023)
 The Ragpicker King (TBA)

Short fiction
"The Girl's Guide to Defeating the Dark Lord", Turn the Other Chick, ed. Esther Friesner, Baen Books (2004) (writing as Cassandra Claire)
"Charming", So Fey, ed. Steve Berman, Haworth Press (2007)
"Graffiti", Magic in the Mirrorstone, ed. Steve Berman, Mirrorstone Books (2008)
"Other Boys", The Eternal Kiss, ed. Trisha Telep, Running Press (2009)
"The Mirror House", Vacations from Hell, ed. Farrin Jacobs, HarperCollins (2009)
"I Never", Geektastic, ed. Holly Black and Cecil Castelucci, Little, Brown (2009)
"Cold Hands", ZVU: Zombies Versus Unicorns, ed. Holly Black and Justine Larbalestier, Simon and Schuster (2010)
"The Perfect Dinner Party" (w/Holly Black), Teeth: Vampire Tales, ed. Ellen Datlow and Terri Windling, HarperCollins (2011)
"The Rowan Gentleman" (w/Holly Black), in Welcome to Bordertown (2011)
"Sisters Before Misters" (w/Sarah Rees Brennan & Holly Black) in Dark Duets: All-New Tales of Horror and Dark Fantasy'' (2014)

Fan fiction (writing as Cassandra Claire)
The Draco Trilogy: "Draco Dormiens", "Draco Sinister", and "Draco Veritas" (Harry Potter)
The Very Secret Diaries (The Lord of the Rings)

References

External links

Author's website
Author's livejournal

1973 births
21st-century American novelists
21st-century American short story writers
21st-century American women writers
American fantasy writers
American women novelists
American women short story writers
Fan fiction writers
Jewish American novelists
Living people
Novelists from Massachusetts
Writers from Amherst, Massachusetts
Pseudonymous women writers
Secular Jews
Women science fiction and fantasy writers
21st-century pseudonymous writers
21st-century American Jews
People involved in plagiarism controversies